Rob Warner may refer to:

 Rob Warner (footballer) (born 1977), English retired footballer
 Rob Warner (mountain biker) (born 1970), English mountain biker, motocross rider and TV presenter
 Rob Warner (academic) (born 1956), vice-chancellor of Plymouth Marjon University

See also
Robert Warner (disambiguation)